Jamie Campbell-Walter is a British professional racing driver. He was born in Oban, Scotland on 16 December 1972. He won the FIA GT Championship in 2000 and took a World Endurance Championship title in 2013 as an Aston Martin Racing factory driver. He now owns and runs Bullet Sports Management with business partner and former team-mate Nicolas Minassian.

Family
Jamie is the son of Richard & Annie Campbell-Walter. Richard Campbell-Walter is the brother of famous 50/60's model Fiona Campbell-Walter. Jamie is the grandson of Rear Admiral Keith McNeil Campbell-Walter.

Early career
Like many young drivers, Campbell-Walter started racing in single seaters. He made his debut in the Formula Vauxhall Junior Winter Series in 1993, taking second place in the championship, followed by a third place in the British national championship in 1994. Campbell-Walter moved to the higher Formula Vauxhall series in 1995 where he was fifth in the championship, which he hoped would propel him into the British Formula 3 Championship the following year. However, even though he did perform one test in a British Formula 3 car, he was unable to find the funding necessary and did only 5 races for James Crofts Racing in the 1996 TVR Tuscan Challenge.

National and international GT racing

In 1997, Campbell-Walter returned to racing, taking a drive in the TVR Tuscan Challenge, a one-make trophy organised by the British manufacturer. He took fourth place in the series championship after winning two rounds for Colin Blower Motorsport. Blower, who was in charge of development for the TVR Cerbera's motorsport program, invited Campbell-Walter to co-drive with him in the racing Cerbera in selected rounds of the British GT Championship. The pair won the Donington Park round before the both of them made their debut in the FIA GT Championship at the 4 Hours of Donington Park, retiring after 38 minutes.

The following year, Campbell-Walter stayed with Colin Blower for the TVR Tuscan Challenge, where he took five wins but was only able to finish fourth in the drivers championship once more. In the British GT Championship, he moved to the Harrier team, finishing 21st in the overall classification and 10th in the GT1 class.

A move to Lister Racing in 1999 saw Campbell-Walter take his first ever drivers championship, winning the British GT title driving alongside Julian Bailey in the Lister Storm GT1. The pair took seven wins in eleven rounds, including the Oulton Park Gold Cup, and lead the Blue Coral G-Force Porsche 911 GT1 driving line-up of Magnus Wallinder and Geoff Lister by 20 points, securing the championship before the season was even over.

Having taken part in selected rounds of the FIA GT Championship in the previous season, Lister Racing made a full force assault on the international series in 2000, retaining the line-up of Campbell-Walter and Bailey. The duo were once again successful, taking the GT1 title with 59 points after five wins in ten races. Campbell-Walter also won the two rounds of the British Championship he took part in, alongside David Warnock, and won six events with a partial season in the TVR Tuscan Challenge. At the end of the season, Campbell-Walter was awarded the John Cobb Memorial Trophy for most outstanding performance by a British driver in international competition.

For the following three seasons, Campbell-Walter remained at Lister Racing, taking another seven wins, and finishing fifth (2001), third (2002) and sixth (2003) in the drivers championship. Over those years he was partnered by Tom Coronel, Nicolaus Springer and Nathan Kinch. In 2002 it was awarded by Autosport Magazine Best international GT driver.

In 2004, Lister reduced its commitments to GT racing and Campbell-Walter moved to privateer Creation Autosportif. However, Creation's Lister was not as competitive as the works car had been on previous years, and Campbell-Walter, driving alongside partner Jamie Derbyshire scored no podium position and finished the championship in 13th place. In 2005, he made a lone appearance in FIA GT to drive in the Spa 24 Hours for Russian Age Racing, taking the wheel of a Ferrari 550 Maranello.

In 2006 Campbell-Walter also drove for the Red Bull BMW team in the Silverstone 24 hours race and won the race, his first 24-hour victory.

In 2007 Campbell-Walter once again won the Silverstone 24-hour race in the Red Bull BMW team and also won the Dubai 24 hours race with the same team and car.

For 2010 & 2011 Jamie joined the Sumo Power GT Team driving the infamous Nissan GTR in the FIA GT1 World Championship. The first was a huge success for such a new car and Campbell-Walter was teamed up with Warren Hughes. For 2011, Campbell-Walter has stayed with the team and has been joined by David Brabham youngest son of 3 time Formula One World Champion Sir Jack Brabham.

For 2012, Campbell-Walter drove for Gulf Racing in a Mclaren MP4 12C with Stuart Hall and Roald Goethe. They contested the Blancpain Endurance series including the famous Spa 24 hour race.

For 2013, Campbell-Walter was signed up by Aston Martin as a factory driver. He contested the FIA World Endurance Championship in an Aston Martin V8 Vantage GTE. A hugely successful year, winning 2 races and finishing on the podium 4 times going on to win the championship. This included a 4th-place finish at Le Mans 24hrs.

Le Mans and prototype racing
Following their years in FIA GT, Creation Autosportif bought its own prototype program, having acquired the Reynard-built DBA 03S from RN Motorsport, later becoming known as the Creation CA06/H. Campbell-Walter was partnered with Nicolas Minassian for the 2004 Le Mans Endurance Series, taking two pole-positions and podium positions at Nurburgring and Spa.

In 2005, the team's fortunes improved and Campbell-Walter and Minassian (occasionally partnered also by Jean-Denis Délétraz) achieved a second place at Silverstone, a third place at Spa, and another third at Istanbul. Campbell-Walter also made his competition debut at the 24 Hours of Le Mans, following a failed attempt in 2003, where his Lister Storm LMP was crashed in qualifying. The Creation team took fourteenth place overall and seventh in class, with Campbell-Walter driving alongside Minassian and Andy Wallace.

For the 2006 season, while Creation expanded to two cars later in the season, Campbell-Walter was forced to drive an Aston Martin DBR9 on occasion for Cirtek Motorsport. Once reunited with Creation, he drove alongside Felipe Ortiz and Beppe Gabbiani to take third place at Donington. He also ran at Le Mans with Ortiz and Gabbiani, but retired three hours before the finish with engine failure.

For 2007, he was once more a driver for Creation Autosportif, driving alongside Shinji Nakano and Felipe Ortiz, taking the first points for the Creation CA07 at Nurburgring. Campbell-Walter achieved one podium in Interlagos, Brazil. Then contributed to getting the team's second and third podiums of the year at Laguna Seca and Petit Le Mans.(USA)

In 2008, Campbell-Walter suffered an accident at Monza, breaking 4 vertebra in his back, he escaped death after having a wishbone fail at 195 mph. Campbell-Walter returned to a race car within 7 months.

In 2009, Campbell-Walter competed at Le Mans 24hrs and finished 14th in class with Vanina Ickx.

In 2013, Campbell-Walter competed at Le Mans 24hrs and finished 4th in class at the wheel of a factory Aston Martin V8 Vantage.

Outside racing
In 2010, Campbell-Walter was the official Formula One driver for the Yas Marina Circuit in Abu Dhabi. He drove the ex Minardi 2 seater Formula One car for promotional purposes and for paying clients.

In 2019 Jamie Campbell-Walter founded a management company together with his former team-mate Nicolas Minassian and María Catarineu, Bullet Sports Management, which represents drivers including FIA WEC and ELMS driver Ferdinand Habsburg, FIA F3 drivers Franco Colapinto and Oliver Goethe, GT World Challenge Europe drivesr Benjamin Goethe and Diego Menchaca and FIA WEC driver Rui Andrade.

Racing record

Complete British GT Championship results
(key) (Races in bold indicate pole position) (Races in italics indicate fastest lap)

Complete FIA GT results

Complete FIA World Endurance Championship results

Complete Le Mans Endurance Series results

24 Hours of Le Mans results

Britcar 24 Hour results

Complete GT1 World Championship results

Touring Car racing

V8 Supercar results

† Not Eligible for points

References

External links

 Drivers' page in the official Creation Autosportif site 
 Jamie Campbell-Walter biography in the official FIA GT Championship site

Scottish racing drivers
FIA GT Championship drivers
24 Hours of Le Mans drivers
People from Oban
British GT Championship drivers
American Le Mans Series drivers
European Le Mans Series drivers
Living people
FIA GT1 World Championship drivers
1972 births
Supercars Championship drivers
FIA World Endurance Championship drivers
Blancpain Endurance Series drivers
24 Hours of Spa drivers
International GT Open drivers
Britcar 24-hour drivers
Sportspeople from Argyll and Bute
24H Series drivers
Aston Martin Racing drivers
Drivex drivers
Motorsport agents